The men's 1500 metres in short track speed skating at the 2018 Winter Olympics took place at the Gangneung Ice Arena in Gangneung, South Korea.

In the victory ceremony, the medals were presented by Irena Szewińska, member of the International Olympic Committee, accompanied by Myong-Hi Chang, ISU honorary member.

History
South Korea has historically performed well in short-track speed skating, with 42 of their 53 medals coming from the event.

Event
There were 12,000 spectators for the event.

Records
Prior to this competition, the existing world and Olympic records were as follows.

One Olympic record was set during the competition.

Results

Heats
 Q – qualified for the semifinals
 ADV – advanced
 PEN – penalty

Semifinals
 QA – qualified for Final A
 QB – qualified for Final B
 ADV – advanced
 PEN – penalty

Finals

Final B (classification round)
In this race, six skaters race for placement.

Final A (medal round)
In the final heat of the event, Hwang Dae-heon collided with Thibaut Fauconnet, with Fauconnet receiving a skate to the face. Defending champion Charles Hamelin did not finish the race. South Korean Lim Hyo-jun finished in first winning by about two blade lengths. He followed closely by Sjinkie Knegt and Semion Elistratov, finishing in second and third respectively. Lim said, "I was nervous in the preliminaries but I liked the quality of the ice. I knew if I made it to the final I had good chances".

The official podium ceremony was the next day, but there was a venue ceremony at the event. The competitors were presented with a plush-tiger Soohorang, one of the Olympic mascots.

References

External links

Men's short track speed skating at the 2018 Winter Olympics